Cursed is the first full-length release by the German band Morgoth. It was released in 1991 by Century Media.

Track listing
 "Cursed" – 2:05  
 "Body Count" – 3:36  
 "Exit to Temptation" – 6:02  
 "Unreal Imagination" – 3:30  
 "Isolated" – 5:25  
 "Sold Baptism" – 3:40  
 "Suffer Life" – 4:26  
 "Opportunity Is Gone" – 7:21  
 "Darkness" – 3:55  (Warning cover)

Credits
Marc Grewe - vocals
Harold Busse - guitars
Carsten Otterbach - guitars
Sebastian Swart - bass
Rüdiger Hennecke - drums/keyboards
 Recorded at Woodhouse Studios, Hagen
 Produced by Randy Burns and Dirk Draeger
 Engineered by Siggi Bemm

References

External links
Other information
Other information

1991 debut albums
Morgoth (band) albums